Brodovitsa is a rural locality (a village) in Permasskoye Rural Settlement, Nikolsky District, Vologda Oblast, Russia. The population was 14 as of 2002.

Geography 
Brodovitsa is located 30 km southeast of Nikolsk (the district's administrative centre) by road. Berezovo is the nearest rural locality.

References 

Rural localities in Nikolsky District, Vologda Oblast